Chulas Fronteras is a 1976 American documentary film which tells the story of the norteño or conjunto music which is played on both sides of the Mexico–Texas border. It was directed by Les Blank. A CD soundtrack of the music played in the film is also available, under the same title.

In 1993, this film was selected for preservation in the United States National Film Registry by the Library of Congress as being "culturally, historically, or aesthetically significant".

References

External links 
Chulas Fronteras essay  by David Wilt at National Film Registry
Chulas Fronteras essay by Daniel Eagan in America's Film Legacy: The Authoritative Guide to the Landmark Movies in the National Film Registry, A&C Black, 2010 , pages 735-737 

 Rotten Tomatoes
 Official website

1976 films
1976 documentary films
American documentary films
Documentary films about music and musicians
Films directed by Les Blank
Regional styles of Mexican music
Norteño (music)
1970s Spanish-language films
United States National Film Registry films
1970s English-language films
1970s American films